The Boondocks are an Estonian indie rock band formed in 2012 in Pärnu, Estonia. The band consists of Villem Sarapuu (guitar/vocals), Hendrik Tamberg (bass/backing vocals), Romet Mägar (guitar) and Karl Kevad (drums/backing vocals). They have released four albums: USB (2014), Thriller (2016), How to Build a Love Bomb (2018) and Soup Can Pop Band (2021).

Biography 
Since their humble beginnings in 2012 in their native coastal town Pärnu, the Estonian indie rockers The Boondocks have built quite a resume for themselves. Their catalogue includes three critically acclaimed full-length albums – “USB” (2014), “Thriller (2016), and “How to Build a Love Bomb”(2018)” – a steady output of fresh singles and beautiful cinematography. Drawing influences from British guitar pop, post-punk, and early RnB, The Boondocks is a multi-layered and nuanced affair. Theirs is a gritty, hard-hitting, guitar-oriented rock’n’roll sound with all its rough and rebellious connotations projected against the backdrop of their polished image, lush and bright soundscapes, rivieraesque pop melodies, and laid-back grooves. Simply said, The Boondocks flirts with old-school rock’n’roll in all its diversity and richness, creating, as a result, an effect of deep familiarity infused with exciting and dizzying disorientation.

This seductive instrumental atmosphere is further complemented by Villem Sarapuu’s deep and dark vocals, and the biting wit of the songwriter Karl Kevad. Lyrically, the band deals with themes as common as romantic attraction and heartache, and, at the same time, weaving in subtle criticism aimed against the consumerist culture and the plastic dullness it both creates and promises to relieve. The band’s relationship with their present age is thus complicated by their playful orientation towards the past. The Boondocks show that there is a certain charm in finding sounds, ideas, and fashion associated with the decades that preceded our own. This past carries with it excitement about its contemporaneity and has hopes for its future. As such, the Boondocks are not using the past to escape the present, rather, they are trying to assume a subject position from which they can look at the present as something mouldable, as a future that has not yet arrived. However, considering that The Boondocks also experiments with irony, we should never quite take them at their word.

All this has not been unnoticed. The alternative music station Raadio 2 has prized them with both the Best New Artist award (2016) and the Album of the Year award (2018). In 2017, the band was voted as the Audience Favourite at the internationally renowned music festival Tallinn Music Week. Having thus assured themselves a firm position in the local rock scene, The Boondocks are currently hard at work at gaining traction in the Baltics, Eastern Europe, Scandinavia, and beyond.

Band members
Villem Sarapuu – lead vocals, guitar
Romet Mägar – guitar, backing vocals
Hendrik Tamberg – bass guitar, backing vocals
Karl Kevad – drums, backing vocals
Touring members
Frederik Küüts – keyboards, percussion
Kristjan Tenso – keyboards, percussion

Discography 
Studio albums
 USB (2014)
 Thriller (2016)
 How to Build a Love Bomb (2018)
  Soup Can Pop Band  (2021)

External links
 
 
 

Boondocks
Musical groups established in 2012
2012 establishments in Estonia